Trần Quang Vinh (1897-1975) was a political leader of the Cao Đài sect active at the time of the establishment of the 1945 Empire of Vietnam.

Vinh had been commander of the Cao Dai's paramilitaries, but stepped aside in August 1945 because of his associations with the Japanese. In October 1945 he was briefly captured by the Viet Minh but escaped after 4 months.

References

1897 births
1975 deaths